The forty-second season of the NBC sketch comedy series Saturday Night Live premiered on October 1, 2016, during the 2016–2017 television season, with host Margot Robbie and musical guest The Weeknd, and concluded on May 20, 2017, with host Dwayne Johnson and musical guest Katy Perry. The season removed two commercial breaks per episode in order to increase programming time. Episode 18 on April 15, 2017, was the first episode ever to be broadcast live in all four time zones within the contiguous United States. Until this episode, the show aired live only in the Eastern and Central time zones, and was tape-delayed in the Mountain and Pacific time zones.

Cast
Prior to the start of the season, longtime cast members Taran Killam and Jay Pharoah, as well as featured player Jon Rudnitsky, were released from the cast. Killam, despite having signed a seven-year contract that would have taken him to the end of this season, was dropped from the cast due in part to issues concerning his work directing the film Killing Gunther, which would have limited his time on the show. Following Killam, Pharoah, and Rudnitsky's departures, the show added three new featured players: SNL staff writer and Wild 'n Out alum Mikey Day, Chicago improviser Alex Moffat, and stand-up comedian and impressionist Melissa Villaseñor. Contrary to rumors, stand-up comedian Chris Redd was not hired this season, but he did join the show as a featured player during the following season. Michael Che, Pete Davidson, and Leslie Jones were all upgraded to repertory status.

Though not a member of the cast, it was announced on September 28, 2016, that Alec Baldwin signed through this season to take over impersonating Donald Trump from Darrell Hammond, who continued on as the show's announcer. 

This was also the final season for cast members Bobby Moynihan, Vanessa Bayer, and Sasheer Zamata. Moynihan had been on the show for nine seasons since 2008, Bayer had been on for seven since 2010, and Zamata had been on for four since 2014.

During this season, Dick Ebersol-era cast member Tony Rosato died at the age of 62 from a heart attack. Rosato thus became the second SNL cast member to have never worked under Lorne Michaels to die (Jean Doumanian-era cast member Charles Rocket, who committed suicide in 2005, was first).

Cast roster

Repertory players
Vanessa Bayer
Beck Bennett
Aidy Bryant
Michael Che
Pete Davidson
Leslie Jones
Colin Jost
Kate McKinnon
Kyle Mooney
Bobby Moynihan
Cecily Strong
Kenan Thompson
Sasheer Zamata

Featured players
Mikey Day
Alex Moffat
Melissa Villaseñor

bold denotes "Weekend Update" anchor

Crew
Prior to the start of the season, short film director Matt Villines (of the directing duo Matt & Oz) died of cancer.

Writers

In August 2016, writing duo Chris Kelly and Sarah Schneider were promoted to co-head writers. In addition, eight new writers were hired for the upcoming season: Kristen Bartlett, Zack Bornstein, Joanna Bradley, Anna Drezen, Julio Torres, Nick Kocher, Brian McElhaney, and Drew Michael. After tweeting a controversial joke about Barron Trump, writer Katie Rich was suspended indefinitely. In January 2017, writer Kent Sublette was elevated to head writer bringing the head writing team to four.

Episodes

Specials

Publicity and controversy

The forty-second season of SNL had a larger-than-usual ratings bump, partially due to sketches surrounding the 2016 presidential election and later the presidency of Donald Trump. According to Forbes writer Madeline Berg, the program "had its best season in 24 years, with an average of 11.3 million viewers in live-plus-seven-day ratings, which marks an increase of 26% from [the previous season]." The Dave Chappelle/A Tribe Called Quest episode saw the highest ratings for the show since Donald Trump's hosting the previous season, and highest in the 18-49 rating demographic since December 2013. The show received its best ratings for an October broadcast in eight years with the Tom Hanks/Lady Gaga episode, while the Alec Baldwin/Ed Sheeran episode in February received the best overall ratings for the season thus far, posting its highest metered-market household rating in six years.

Republican candidate Donald Trump — who hosted SNL the previous season and eventually secured the presidency in November — was unhappy with his portrayal on the show by recurring guest Alec Baldwin. On multiple occasions, both before and after winning the election, Trump used Twitter to publicize his thoughts on the impersonation, as well as the show: "Watched Saturday Night Live hit job on me. Time to retire the boring and unfunny show. Alec Baldwin portrayal stinks," he tweeted the morning after the Emily Blunt/Bruno Mars episode on October 16, 2016. "It is a totally one-sided, biased show —nothing funny at all. Equal time for us?", he posted on November 20 after the Kristen Wiig/The xx episode, suggesting the show follow the equal-time rule, despite the presidential race being over. His criticism continued preceding his inauguration: he dubbed it "unwatchable" on December 4, and tweeted "Saturday Night Live is the worst of NBC. Not funny, cast is terrible, always a complete hit job. Really bad television!" after the Felicity Jones/Sturgill Simpson episode on January 15, 2017.

References

42
Saturday Night Live in the 2010s
2016 American television seasons
2017 American television seasons
Television shows directed by Don Roy King